In mathematics, and, more specifically in numerical analysis and computer algebra, real-root isolation of a polynomial consist of producing disjoint intervals of the real line, which contain each one (and only one) real root of the polynomial, and, together, contain all the real roots of the polynomial.

Real-root isolation is useful because usual root-finding algorithms for computing the real roots of a polynomial may produce some real roots, but, cannot generally certify having found all real roots. In particular, if such an algorithm does not find any root, one does not know whether it is because there is no real root. Some algorithms compute all complex roots, but, as there are generally much fewer real roots than complex roots, most of their computation time is generally spent for computing non-real roots (in the average, a polynomial of degree  has  complex roots, and only  real roots; see ). Moreover, it may be difficult to distinguish the real roots from the non-real roots with small imaginary part (see the example of Wilkinson's polynomial in next section).

The first complete real-root isolation algorithm results from Sturm's theorem (1829). However, when real-root-isolation algorithms began to be implemented on computers it appeared that algorithms derived from Sturm's theorem are less efficient than those derived from Descartes' rule of signs (1637).

Since the beginning of 20th century there is an active research activity for improving the algorithms derived from Descartes' rule of signs, getting very efficient implementations, and computing their computational complexity. The best implementations can routinely isolate real roots of polynomials of degree more than 1,000.

Specifications and general strategy
For finding real roots of a polynomial, the common strategy is to divide the real line (or an interval of it where root are searched) into disjoint intervals until having at most one root in each interval. Such a procedure is called root isolation, and a resulting interval that contains exactly one root is an isolating interval for this root.

Wilkinson's polynomial shows that a very small modification of one coefficient of a polynomial may change dramatically not only the value of the roots, but also their nature (real or complex). Also, even with a good approximation, when one evaluates a polynomial at an approximate root, one may get a result that is far to be close to zero. Therefore, if one wants to isolate roots of a polynomial with floating-point coefficients, it is often better to convert them to rational numbers, and then take the primitive part of the resulting polynomial, for having a polynomial with integer coefficients.

For this reason, although the methods that are described below work theoretically with real numbers, they are generally used in practice with polynomials with integer coefficients, and intervals ending with rational numbers.  Also, the polynomials are always supposed to be square free. There are two reasons for that. Firstly Yun's algorithm for computing the square-free factorization is less costly than twice the cost of the computation of the greatest common divisor of the polynomial and its derivative. As this may produce factors of lower degrees, it is generally advantageous to apply root-isolation algorithms only on polynomials without multiple roots, even when this is not required by the algorithm. The second reason for considering only square-free polynomials is that the fastest root-isolation algorithms do not work in the case of multiple roots.

For root isolation, one requires a procedure for counting the real roots of a polynomial in an interval without having to compute them, or, at least a procedure for deciding whether an interval contains zero, one or more roots. With such a decision procedure, one may work with a working list of intervals that may contain real roots. At the beginning, the list contains a single interval containing all roots of interest, generally the whole real line or its positive part. Then each interval of the list is divided into two smaller intervals. If one of the new intervals does not contain any root, it is removed from the list. If it contains one root, it is put in an output list of isolating intervals. Otherwise, it is kept in the working list for further divisions, and the process may continue until all roots are eventually isolated

Sturm's theorem
The first complete root-isolation procedure results of Sturm's theorem (1829), which expresses the number of real roots in an interval in terms of the number of sign variations of the values of a sequence of polynomials, called Sturm's sequence, at the ends of the interval. Sturm's sequence is the sequence of remainders that occur in a variant of Euclidean algorithm applied to the polynomial and its derivatives. When implemented on computers, it appeared that root isolation with Sturm's theorem is less efficient than the other methods that are described below. Consequently, Sturm's theorem is rarely used for effective computations, although it remains useful for theoretical purposes.

Descartes' rule of signs and its generalizations

Descartes' rule of signs asserts that the difference between the number of sign variations in the sequence of the coefficients of a polynomial and the number of its positive real roots is a nonnegative even integer. It results that if this number of sign variations is zero, then the polynomial does not have any positive real roots, and, if this number is one, then the polynomial has a unique positive real root, which is a single root. Unfortunately the converse is not true, that is, a polynomial which has either no positive real root or has a single positive simple root may have a number of sign variations greater than 1.

Budan's may provide a real-root-isolation algorithm for a square-free polynomial (a polynomial without multiple root): from the coefficients of polynomial, one may compute an upper bound  of the absolute values of the roots and a lower bound  on the absolute values of the differences of two roots (see Properties of polynomial roots). The isolating intervals are thus the intervals for which Budan's theorem asserts an odd number of roots.

However, this algorithm is very inefficient, as one cannot use a coarser partition of the interval , because, if Budan's theorem gives a result larger than 1 for an interval of larger size, there is no way for insuring that it does not contain several roots.

Vincent's and related theorems
 (1834) provides a method for real-root isolation, which is at the basis of the most efficient real-root-isolation algorithms. It concerns the positive real roots of a square-free polynomial (that is a polynomial without multiple roots). If  is a sequence of positive real numbers, let 

be the th convergent of the continued fraction

For proving his theorem, Vincent proved a result that is useful on its own:

For working with real numbers, one may always choose , but, as effective computations are done with rational numbers, it is generally convenient to suppose that  are integers.

The "small enough" condition has been quantified independently by Nikola Obreshkov, and Alexander Ostrowski:

For polynomials with integer coefficients, the minimum distance  may be lower bounded in terms of the degree of the polynomial and the maximal absolute value of its coefficients; see . This allows the analysis of worst-case complexity of algorithms based on Vincent's theorems. However, Obreschkoff–Ostrowski theorem shows that the number of iterations of these algorithms depend on the distances between roots in the neighborhood of the working interval; therefore, the number of iterations may vary dramatically for different roots of the same polynomial.

James V. Uspensky gave a bound on the length of the continued fraction (the integer  needed, in Vincent's theorem, for getting zero or one sign variations:

Continued fraction method

The use of continued fractions for real-root isolation has been introduced by Vincent, although he credited Joseph-Louis Lagrange for this idea, without providing a reference. For making an algorithm of Vincent's theorem, one must provide a criterion for choosing the  that occur in his theorem. Vincent himself provided some choice (see below). Some other choices are possible, and the efficiency of the algorithm may depend dramatically on these choices. Below is presented an algorithm, in which these choices result from an auxiliary function that will be discussed later.

For running this algorithm one must work with a list of intervals represented by a specific data structure. The algorithm works by choosing an interval, removing it from the list, adding zero, one or two smaller intervals to the list, and possibly outputs an isolation interval.

One has 

The algorithm works with a list of intervals that, at the beginning, contains the two intervals  and  corresponding to the partition of the reals into the positive and the negative ones (one may suppose that zero is not a root, as, if it were, it suffices to apply the algorithm to ). In pseudocode, this gives the following, where  denotes the number of sign variations of the coefficients of the polynomial .

 function continued fraction is
     input: P(x), a square-free polynomial,
     output: a list of pairs of rational numbers defining isolating intervals
     /* Initialization */
         L := [(P(x), x), (P(–x), –x)]                /* two starting intervals */
         Isol := [ ]
     /* Computation */
     while L  [ ] do
         Choose (A(x), M(x)) in L, and remove it from L
         v := var(A)
         if v = 0 then exit                /* no root in the interval */
         if v = 1 then                     /* isolating interval found */
             add (M(0), M(∞)) to Isol
             exit
         b := some positive integer
         B(x) = A(x + b)
         w := v – var(B)
         if B(0) = 0 then                         /* rational root found */
             add (M(b), M(b)) to Isol
             B(x) := B(x)/x
         add (B(x),  M(b + x) to L           /* roots in (b, +∞) */
         if w = 0 then exit                  /* Budan's theorem */ 
         if w = 1 then                       /* Budan's theorem again */ 
             add (M(0), M(b)) to Isol
         if w > 1 then
             add A(b/(1 + x)),  M(b/(1 + x)) to L      /* roots in (0, b) */

In Vincent's papers, and in Uspensky's book, one has always , with the difference that Uspensky did not use Budan's theorem for avoiding further bisections of the interval associated to 

The drawback of always choosing  is that one has to do many successive changes of variable of the form . These may be replaced by a single change of variable , but, nevertheless, one has to do the intermediate changes of variables for applying Budan's theorem.

A way for improving the efficiency of the algorithm is to take for  a lower bound of the positive real roots, computed from the coefficients of the polynomial (see Properties of polynomial roots for such bounds).

Bisection method
The bisection method consists roughly of starting from an interval containing all real roots of a polynomial, and divides it recursively into two parts until getting eventually intervals that contain either zero or one root. For technical reasons (simpler changes of variable, simpler complexity analysis, possibility of taking advantage of the binary analysis of computers), the algorithms are generally presented as starting with the interval . There is no loss of generality, as the changes of variables  and  move respectively the positive and the negative roots in the interval . (The single changes variable  may also be used.)

The method requires an algorithm for testing whether an interval has zero, one, or possibly several roots, and for warranting termination, this testing algorithm must exclude the possibility of getting infinitely many times the output "possibility of several roots". Sturm's theorem and Vincent's auxiliary theorem provide such convenient tests. As the use Descartes' rule of signs and Vincent's auxiliary theorem is much more computationally efficient than the use of Sturm's theorem, only the former is described in this section.

The bisection method based on Descartes' rules of signs and Vincent's auxiliary theorem has been introduced in 1976 by Akritas and Collins under the name of Modified Uspensky algorithm, and has been referred to as the Uspensky algorithm, the Vincent–Akritas–Collins algorithm, or Descartes method, although Descartes, Vincent and Uspensky never described it.

The method works as follows. For searching the roots in some interval, one changes first the variable for mapping the interval onto  giving a new polynomial . If there is one sign variation, then one has an isolation interval. Vincent's auxiliary theorem insures the termination of this procedure.

Except for the initialization, all these changes of variable consists of the composition of at most two very simple changes of variable which are the scalings by two , the translation , and the inversion , the latter consisting simply of reverting the order of the coefficients of the polynomial.

Pseudocode

The following notation is used in the pseudocode that follows.
  is the polynomial for which the real roots in the interval  have to be isolated
  denotes the number of sign variations in the sequence of the coefficients of the polynomial 
 The elements of working list have the form , where 

 function bisection is
     input: , a square-free polynomial, such that , 
                       for which the roots in the interval  are searched
     output: a list of triples , 
                       representing isolating intervals of the form 
     /* Initialization */
     L := [(0, 0, p(x))] /* a single element in the working list L */
     Isol := [ ]
     n := degree(p}}
     /* Computation */
     while L  [ ] do
         Choose (c, k,  in L, and remove it from L
         if  then
             
             n := n – 1                /* A rational root found */
             add (c, k, 0) to Isol
         v := 
         if v = 1 then                /* An isolating interval found */
             add (c, k, 1) to Isol
         if v > 1 then                /* Bisecting */
             add (2c, k + 1,   to L
             add (2c + 1, k + 1,   to L
     end

This procedure is essentially the one that has been described by Collins and Akritas. The running time depends mainly on the number of intervals that have to be considered, and on the changes of variables. There are ways for improving the efficiency, which have been an active subject of research since the publication of the algorithm, and mainly since the beginning of the 21st century.

Recent improvements
Various ways for improving Akritas–Collins bisection algorithm have been proposed. They include a method for avoiding storing a long list of polynomials without losing the simplicity of the changes of variables, the use of approximate arithmetic (floating point and interval arithmetic) when it allows getting the right value for the number of sign variations, the use of Newton's method when possible, the use of fast polynomial arithmetic, shortcuts for long chains of bisections in case of clusters of close roots, bisections in unequal parts for limiting instability problems in polynomial evaluation.

All these improvement lead to an algorithm for isolating all real roots of a polynomial with integer coefficients, which has the complexity (using soft O notation, for omitting logarithmic factors)

where  is the degree of the polynomial,  is the number of nonzero terms,  is the maximum of digits of the coefficients.

The implementation of this algorithm appears to be more efficient than any other implemented method for computing the real roots of a polynomial, even in the case of polynomials having very close roots (the case which was previously the most difficult for the bisection method).

References

Sources

Polynomials
Root-finding algorithms
Real algebraic geometry
Computer algebra